Shelley (I. Sheldon) Posen is a Canadian folklorist, singer and songwriter, a member of the folk trio Finest Kind, and a former writer of the 'Songfinder' column for Sing Out!  In the 1970s, while still a graduate student, he was the Director of Mariposa in the Schools. He conducted fieldwork and recorded traditional songs extensively in the Ottawa Valley. He was Curator of Canadian Folklife at the Canadian Museum of Civilization/Canadian Museum of History from 2001 to 2015.When Two Careers Are Better Than One, by Randy Ray, undated.  Accessed January 9, 2008.  He has written on traditional song, Canadian sports and cultural heroes, and the folklore of Canadian foods such as the butter tart.

Publications and articles
 Old Bush Songs: The Centenary Edition of Banjo Paterson's Classic Collection (review)  Folk Music Journal, January 1, 2007.
 English-French Macaronic Songs in Canada - A Research Note and Query. Folksongs 
 Posen, I.S. and Taft M. The Newfoundland Popular Music Project. Canadian Folk Music Journal 1 (1973) pages 17–23
 Posen, I.S. and Sciorra, J. Brooklyn's Dancing Tower. Natural History 96(6) 1983  pages 30–37

Books authored

 Posen, Sheldon and Erin Gursky (2015). Terry Fox: Running to the Heart of Canada. Canadian Museum of History.  
  
 The Canadian Pub Caroler compiled by Shelley Posen, OFC Publications, Ottawa, Ontario, Canada 2002. ISSM # m-706023-00-7 
 For Singing and Dancing and All Sorts of Fun (1988) . Winner of the 1991 Porcupine Book Award
 
 
 Posen, Shelley (2020). The Maple Syrup Maker's Alphabet. Illustrated by Magdalene Carson. Ontario, Canada: Ontario Maple Syrup Producers' Association. ISBN 978-0-9948927-2-0.

Music
Songs
For a listing of Shelley Posen's recorded songs to 2022, see http://shelleyposen.com/shelley-posen-song-catalogue/
 No More Fish, No Fishermen
 Having a Drink with Jane
 When First I Stepped in a Canoe
 S'mores
 Everyone Loves Shabbes But the Chickens
 The La-La-Latke Song
 So How Come You Don't Have Tongue?
 And We Sang 'Ha Lakhma Anya'''
 Fork Garden
 Thanks for the Song
 Christmas Trilogy
 There's Always Money for a War
 Long, Long Tunnel 2020 

Solo Albums
 Mazel 2022
 Old Loves 2022
 Ontario Moon 2019
 Roseberry Road 2014
 Menorah: Songs from a Jewish Life 2007
 The Old Songs' Home 2003
 Manna'' 2003

Albums as part of Finest Kind
 Lost in a Song 1996
 Heart's Delight 1999
 Silks & Spices 2004
 Feasts & Spirits 2004
 For Honour & For Gain 2010
 From Shore to Shore 2014
 I Am Christmas 2018

References

External links
Shelley Posen (official website)
BBC Four

Canadian folklorists
Canadian folk-song collectors
Jewish Canadian musicians
Canadian folk musicians
Living people
Musicians from Toronto
Year of birth missing (living people)